Federal Highway 10 (Fed. 10 ) is a free part of the federal highways corridors of Mexico.

It passes through the northern part of Chihuahua. 

Fed. 10's northern terminus is in Janos, Chihuahua where it joins Fed. 2. It continues south to the city of Nuevo Casas Grandes, the main city in the region. Afterwards, it continues until Buenaventura where it changes its direction from north-west to south-east and east, passing through the town of Ricardo Flores Magon and joining Fed. 45 at El Sueco, Chihuahua.

References

1010
1010
010